Virtuoso is a 2007 album by violinist David Garrett, released in Europe. Its tracks, listed below, are mostly borrowed from his earlier album, Free:

Track listing 
 "La Califfa" (Ennio Morricone) – 2:46
 "Carmen Fantasie" (Georges Bizet) featuring Paco Peña, guitar – 4:15
 "Nothing Else Matters" (Metallica) – 3:32
 "Csardas Gypsy Dance" (Vittorio Monti) – 3:27
 "Duelling Banjos" (from the film Deliverance) – 2:11
 "Pachelbel's Canon" – 3:16
 "Paganini Rhapsody" (on Caprice 24) – 4:08
 "Somewhere" (from Leonard Bernstein's musical West Side Story) – 3:01
 "The Flight of the Bumble Bee" (Nikolai Rimsky-Korsakov) – 1:20
 "Serenade" (David Garrett, Franck van der Heijden) – 3:38
 "Toccata" (David Garrett, Franck van der Heijden) – 3:50
 "You Raise Me Up" (Brendan Graham, Rolf Løvland) – 4:15
 "Eliza's Song" (David Garrett, Franck van der Heijden) – 2:59

Personnel 

Jennifer Allan – production coordination
Kevin Bacon – bass, percussion, arranger, producer, mixing
Rick Blaskey – executive producer, representation
Ed Boyd – guitar
Paul Chessell – art direction
Tom Coyne – mastering
Thomas Dyani – percussion
Ali Friend – double bass
David Garrett – violin, arranger, producer, liner notes
Tim Goalen – assistant producer
Robert Groslot – conductor
Ian Harrison – cover photo
Mitch Jenkins – photography
Robbie McIntosh – guitar
Mark Millington – design
Paco Peña – flamenco guitar
Jonathan Quarmby – guitar, piano, arranger, organ (hammond), whistle, producer, mixing
Samantha Rowe – cello
Darren Rumney – design
Rob Sannen – assistant engineer
Jacky Schroer – A&R
Mark Sheridan – guitar, background vocals, flamenco guitar
Lloyd Wade – background vocals
Ian Watson – accordion
Tim Weller – drums
Damon "Day" Wilson – drums

Certifications

References 

2007 albums
David Garrett (musician) albums